Cicindela waynei, known generally as the bruneau dune tiger beetle or bruneau tiger beetle, is a species of flashy tiger beetle in the family Carabidae. It is found exclusively in Idaho, a state of the United States in North America.

References

Further reading

 
 

waynei
Articles created by Qbugbot
Beetles described in 2001
Beetles of North America